Valliamman Cave Temple  is a Hindu temple dedicated to Tamil Goddess Sri Valli, Consort of Lord Muruga, situated in the northeast corner of Arulmigu Subramaniya Swamy Temple, Tiruchendur Complex. In early days, the temple was situated very near to the sea shore and now due to the construction of pathways the sea get backed to some extent. The Goddess is residing inside a cave of the sandal mountain remainings.

Temple complex
The Valli cave temple complex consists of a sanctum sanctorum in which Goddess Sri Valli resides. The sanctum sanctorum is situated inside a cave. A narrow path from the Mahamandapam leads to the sanctum sanctorum. The sanctum sanctorum and the paths are situated inside the caves of sandal mountains. In front of the cave, a mandapam with 16 pillars is constructed which is 24.5 feet long and 21.5 feet broad. The main gateway to the temple is situated in south facing towards the Arulmigu Subramaniya Swamy Temple, Tiruchendur.

Inside the cave, paintings and statues of God Muruga and Valli story are present.

Legend
According to the Legend, God Muruga married Sri Valli (Love Marriage) and Sri Deivayanai (Arranged marriage). Sri Valli is the daughter of King of Mountain tribes. God Muruga fell in love with Sri Valli. To get her favour God Muruga asked the help of his brother Lord Ganesha. Lord Ganesha took the form of an elephant and he chased Sri Valli. Driven by fear, Sri Valli entered into the cave to get safe from elephant. God Muruga appeared in the form of an old sage and saved Sri Valli from the elephant. In return Sri valli offered to fulfill the wishes of the old sage. The Old sage asked Sri Valli as his wife and she got irritated. At Last, God Muruga appeared in his original form and Sri Valli also fell in love with God Muruga and agreed for marriage. Later a temple was built around the cave in where Sri Valli is believed to be hidden during elephant chase.

References

External links
 Valli Cave
 Valli Hiding inside Cave
 Valli Cave Location
 Valli Cave Mandapas
 Tiruchendur Sandal Mountain Remains 
 Tiruchendur Sandal Mountain Remains
 Cave structure and legend
 Tiruchendur Valliamman Temple

Hindu temples in Thoothukudi district
Kaumaram
Thoothukudi